Rampur Parori is a native village in Dumra, Sitamarhi, India.

References

Villages in Sitamarhi district